Verrasundet is a fjord in Trøndelag county, Norway. It extends from Beitstadfjorden to the village of Verrabotn.

See also
 List of Norwegian fjords

References

Fjords of Trøndelag
Steinkjer
Inderøy
Indre Fosen